The following are the winners of the 13th annual ENnie Awards, held in 2013:

Judges' Spotlight Winners 
Hooper – Leviathans (Catalyst Game Labs)
Matthew Muth – School Daze (Sand & Steam Productions)
Jakud Nowosad – Deniable Asset (Random Encounters)
Megan Robertson – Killshot: Director's Cut (Broken Ruler Games)
Kurt Wiegel – Eldritch Skies (Battlefield Press, Inc.)

Gold and Silver Winners

References

External links
 2013 ENnie Awards

 
ENnies winners